Filip Stojanović (born 19 May 1988) is a Serbian professional footballer who plays as a midfielder for Budućnost Dobanovci.

Career
Born in Belgrade, Stojanović started out at Obilić, making his senior debut in the 2006–07 season. He was later acquired by Romanian club Gloria Buzău, but failed to make any appearances. In 2010, Stojanović joined BASK and helped them win the Serbian League Belgrade (2009–10) and subsequently the Serbian First League (2010–11). However, the club ceded its Serbian SuperLiga spot to Novi Pazar and numerous players headed in the same direction, including Stojanović. He also played for Voždovac and Donji Srem, before moving to Maltese Premier League side Naxxar Lions in early 2014.

In the summer of 2014, Stojanović signed with Radnik Surdulica and helped them win promotion to the Serbian SuperLiga for the first time in history. He later played for Trikala (Greece) and Radnik Bijeljina (Bosnia and Herzegovina), before returning to Radnik Surdulica in June 2018. In July 2019, Stojanović signed with Mladost Lučani.

Honours
BASK
 Serbian First League: 2010–11
 Serbian League Belgrade: 2009–10
Radnik Surdulica
 Serbian First League: 2014–15

References

External links
 Srbijafudbal profile
 
 

1988 births
Footballers from Belgrade
Living people
Serbian footballers
Association football midfielders
FK Obilić players
FC Gloria Buzău players
FK BASK players
FK Novi Pazar players
FK Voždovac players
FK Donji Srem players
Naxxar Lions F.C. players
FK Radnik Surdulica players
Trikala F.C. players
FK Radnik Bijeljina players
FK Mladost Lučani players
FK Kolubara players
FK Budućnost Dobanovci players
Serbian First League players
Serbian SuperLiga players
Maltese Premier League players
Football League (Greece) players
Premier League of Bosnia and Herzegovina players
Serbian expatriate footballers
Expatriate footballers in Romania
Expatriate footballers in Malta
Expatriate footballers in Greece
Expatriate footballers in Bosnia and Herzegovina
Serbian expatriate sportspeople in Romania
Serbian expatriate sportspeople in Malta
Serbian expatriate sportspeople in Greece
Serbian expatriate sportspeople in Bosnia and Herzegovina